Typology is the study of types or the systematic classification of the types of something according to their common characteristics. Typology is the act of finding, counting and classification facts with the help of eyes, other senses and logic. Typology may refer to:

 Typology (anthropology), division of culture by races
 Typology (archaeology), classification of artefacts according to their characteristics
 Typology (linguistics), study and classification of languages according to their structural features
 Morphological typology, a method of classifying languages
 Typology (psychology), a model of personality types
 Psychological typologies, classifications used by psychologists to describe the distinctions between people
 Typology (statistics), a concept in statistics, research design and social sciences
 Typology (theology), in Christian theology, the interpretation of some figures and events in the Old Testament as foreshadowing the New Testament
 Typology (urban planning and architecture), the classification of characteristics common to buildings or urban spaces
 Building typology, relating to buildings and architecture
 Farm typology, farm classification by the USDA
 Sociopolitical typology, four types, or levels, of a political organization

See also
 
 The Bechers' photographic typologies
 Blanchard's transsexualism typology, a controversial classification of transwomen
 Johnson's Typology, a classification of intimate partner violence (IPV)
 Topology (disambiguation)
 Type (disambiguation)
 Typification, a process of creating standard (typical) social construction based on standard assumptions
 Typology of Greek vase shapes, classification of Greek vases
 Typography